Joseph Wakaba Mucheru EGH was the former Kenyan Cabinet Secretary in the Ministry of Information and Communications He was appointed by the then President of Kenya Uhuru Kenyatta. Joe held that office since from 2015 to 2022.

Early life and education 
Mucheru attended the Nairobi Primary School between 1977 and 1982, his high school education was at Lenana School between 1983 (form 1) and 1988 (form 6). He attended the Business Executive Programme from Stanford University Graduate School of Business in 2008. He  holds a (B Sc. (Hons)) in Economics & Computer Science from  City University London.
He was awarded the Moran of the order of the burning spear in December 2010 by the President of the Republic of Kenya, Mwai Kibaki. He is a member of the Africa Leadership Network, The National Prayer Breakfast, and the East African Business Summit.

Career 
He is a former Google Sub-Sahara Africa Lead based in the Google Nairobi office. He was Google's first Sub-Saharan employee and was key to setting up Google's presence in Africa from 2007. Before joining Google he worked at Wananchi Online, a company he co-founded in 1999, in  various roles at the company including Chief Technology Officer and Chief Executive Officer.

Joseph Mucheru has been on the boards of many companies and businesses, including the M-Pesa Foundation Academy advisory board, the payments platform Bitpesa (now Aza Group), and GiveDirectly, which aims to cut out the intermediary and ensure that donations go straight to the intended recipients.

Personal life 
Mucheru married Aida Wambui in 2005 under Kikuyu traditional laws. The marriage lasted for ten years, Wambui filed for divorce on June 29, 2015, claiming her marriage to Mucheru had irretrievably broken down and that their union was a “sham without feelings.”

References

People from Nairobi
Living people
Chief technology officers
Kenyan chief executives
Stanford University alumni
Government ministers of Kenya
1968 births